= Tenka Ikka no Kai =

Pyramid scheme run by Ken'ichi Uchimura

Tenka Ikka no Kai (天下一家の会, Tenka ikka no kai, literally meaning "The Society of One Family under the Heavens") was a pyramid scheme run by Ken'ichi Uchimura (内村健一). Behind the Tenka Ikka no Kai was the Dai-ichi Sōgo Keizai Kenkyūsho (第一相互経済研究所), run by Uchimura. This organization, established in 1972, once had a million members. It was a cause of the enactment of Japan's law prohibiting pyramid schemes. In 1986 the Dai-ichi Sōgo Keizai Kenkyūsho declared bankruptcy, leaving debts amounting to 189,600,000,000 yen. It has been called "the biggest pyramid scheme in history."
